César E. Chávez National Monument, also known as Nuestra Señora Reina de la Paz, is a  U.S. National Monument in Keene, Kern County, California, located about 32 miles away from Bakersfield, California. The property was the headquarters of the United Farm Workers (UFW), and home to César Chávez from the early 1970s until his death in 1993. Chávez's gravesite is located in the property's gardens along with that of his wife, Helen Fabela Chávez.  Originally developed as a headquarters and worker housing area for a quarry, it served as a tuberculosis sanitarium (known as Stony Brook Sanitorium) in the early 1900s, until its acquisition by the UFW in the early 1970s.

History
Cesar E. Chavez National Monument was established by President Barack Obama on October 8, 2012 by proclamation under authority of the Antiquities Act. The property is known as Nuestra Señora Reina de la Paz (La Paz), which was designated as a National Historic Landmark along with the monument on October 8, 2012.

The monument is the 398th unit in the National Park System and is managed collaboratively by the National Park Service and the National Chavez Center. The Center and members of the Chávez family donated properties of La Paz to the federal government to establish the national monument. Initial funding was provided by the National Park Foundation and the America Latino Heritage Fund. Some of the monument's services and programs are still in development, but a visitor center and memorial garden where Chavez is buried are open to the public. Certain areas of the monument are closed to the public due to the Chávez family still living in La Paz, and members of the UFW still working in the UFW offices located on the property.

Proposed inclusion in national park
In October 2013, the site was identified as one of several to be part of a proposed new National Historical Park to commemorate the life and work of Cesar Chávez and the farm worker movement. Other sites for the proposed new park—which requires Congressional approval—include the Filipino Community Hall in Delano, California (headquarters of the Delano grape strike), The Forty Acres (the original UFW headquarters in Delano), McDonnell Hall in San Jose, and the Santa Rita Center in Phoenix, Arizona.

See also
California Historical Landmarks in Kern County, California
List of National Historic Landmarks in California
National Register of Historic Places listings in Kern County, California
List of National Monuments of the United States

References

External links

NPS: Official Cesar E. Chavez National Monument website
Chavezfoundation.org: Cesar Chavez Foundation

United Farm Workers
National Park Service National Monuments in California
Chavez, Cesar
History museums in California
Museums in Kern County, California
Protected areas of Kern County, California
History of labor relations in the United States
National Monuments designated by Barack Obama
National Register of Historic Places in Kern County, California
Protected areas established in 2012
2012 establishments in California
Cesar Chavez